Pedro Mario Maffia (August 28, 1899 – October 16, 1967) was an Argentine tango bandoneonist, bandleader, composer and teacher, as well as starring in several tango films.

Maffia had a hard upbringing; he was beaten with a chain by his father and lived in dire poverty. He eventually ran away from home to live in the town of Punta Alta in Buenos Aires Province, where he was discovered by Carlos Gardel and José Razzano.

Maffia is remembered as a pioneer of the bandoneon and a great stylist. He was one of the first to play the instrument a cappella. He had a relaxed playing style and an inventiveness for misplaced accents and nuances.

Maffia starred in a number of tango films including ¡Tango! (1933), Canillita (1936) and Fueye querido (1966). He also worked as a music teacher, and wrote an important method of teaching the bandoneon.

The bandoneonist Aníbal Troilo dedicated a song to him entitled A Pedro Maffia.

External links 
Pedro Maffia at todotango.com
Pedro Maffia at tango.info

1899 births
1967 deaths
Tango musicians
Argentine musicians
Male tango film actors
Argentine people of Italian descent
People from Buenos Aires
20th-century Argentine male actors
Burials at La Chacarita Cemetery